The West Indies cricket team toured Australia from 2 December 2015 to 7 January 2016 to play two tour matches and three Test matches. Australia won the Test series 2–0, retaining the Frank Worrell Trophy.

Adam Voges won the inaugural Richie Benaud Medal as the player of the series.

Squads

West Indies fast bowler Shannon Gabriel was ruled out of the series after sustaining an ankle injury on day one of the Hobart Test. He was replaced by Miguel Cummins. Usman Khawaja and Stephen O'Keefe were added to Australia's squad for the second and third Tests.
Nathan Coulter-Nile was ruled out of the series after he dislocated his shoulder while playing in the Big Bash League. He was replaced by Scott Boland.

Tour matches

First-class match: Cricket Australia XI vs West Indians

Tour match: Victorian XI vs West Indians

Test series (Frank Worrell Trophy)

1st Test

2nd Test

3rd Test

References

External links
 Series home at ESPN Cricinfo

2015 in Australian cricket
2015 in West Indian cricket
International cricket competitions in 2015–16
2015-16
2015–16 Australian cricket season